The 1870–71 United States Senate elections were held on various dates in various states. As these U.S. Senate elections were prior to the ratification of the Seventeenth Amendment in 1913, senators were chosen by state legislatures. Senators were elected over a wide range of time throughout 1870 and 1871, and a seat may have been filled months late or remained vacant due to legislative deadlock. In these elections, terms were up for the senators in Class 2.

The Republican Party lost five seats, though it still retained an overwhelming majority.  In advance of these elections, the last four seceded states were readmitted to the Senate.

Mississippian Hiram Rhodes Revels became the first African American to be elected as a U.S. Senator and become a member of Congress.

In Georgia, Foster Blodgett was elected and presented his credentials as Senator-elect, but the Senate declared him not elected.

In Virginia, Republican John F. Lewis and Democrat John W. Johnston were elected on January 26, 1870 to fill seats that had been vacant since 1864 and 1865.

Results summary 
Senate party division, 42nd Congress (1871–1873)

 Majority party: Republican (55)
 Minority party: Democratic (14)
 Other parties: Liberal Republican (1)
 Vacant: (4)
 Total seats: 74

Change in Senate composition

By March 30, 1870 
After the readmission of Virginia, Texas, and Mississippi, and the special elections in Iowa and Maine.

Before the elections 
Including the February 1871 readmission of Georgia.

Result of the elections

Beginning of the next Congress

Race summaries

Special elections during the 41st Congress 
In these elections, the winners were seated during 1870 or in 1871 before March 4; ordered by election date.

Races leading to the 42nd Congress 

In these regular elections, the winners were elected for the term beginning March 4, 1871; ordered by state.

All of the elections involved the Class 2 seats.

Elections during the 42nd Congress 
In this election, the winner was elected in 1871 after March 4.

See also
 1870 United States elections
 1870–71 United States House of Representatives elections
 41st United States Congress
 42nd United States Congress

Notes

References

External links